The world record for a conventional wheeled passenger train is held by France's TGV (Train à Grande Vitesse), set in 2007 when it reached  on a  section of track.

Japan's experimental maglev train L0 Series achieved  on a 42.8 km magnetic levitation track in 2015.

World speed records
Legend:
 Arr (Arrangement)  Disposition and number of elements forming the train.
 LocOne locomotive pulling one or more cars)
 Multi Multi Motorized Elements
 Single Single rail vehicle
 Power DC, DC 3rd rail, AC, Single phase, Triphase, Diesel-elec., Gas, Steam, Diesel-hydraulic, Propeller, Rocket, Jet.
 State "Proto." (Prototype), "Unmod." (Unmodified from vehicles in service), "unknown" (Unknown), "Tuned"

All passenger trains
The following is a partial list of absolute world speed records for all trains designed to carry passengers, regardless of gauge, propulsion or type of rail,

Conventional wheeled

The following is a list of verified absolute world speed records for conventional wheeled rail vehicles.

Electric
The following is a list of speed records for rail vehicles with electric traction motors and powered by electricity transferred to the train.

Fuel-electric
The following is a list of speed records for rail vehicles with on-board fuel to generate electricity for traction motors such as diesel-electric locomotive, diesel electric multiple unit and gas turbine-electric locomotive trains.

Fuel-mechanic
The following is a list of speed records for rail vehicles with on-board fuel to mechanical energy to drive vehicle's wheels such as diesel-hydraulic trains and gas turbine locomotive trains that use mechanical transmission to power the drive wheels.

Steam
The following is a list of speed records for steam locomotives.

Note:

Air propulsion
The following is a list of speed records for rail vehicles that use air propulsion to move rail vehicles while the wheels are rolling along the track.

Conventional wheeled – Narrow gauge

Maglev trains

Rocket sleds

World fastest point-to-point average speeds in commercial operations
The following are the lists of world record average operating speeds between two stations. The average speeds are measured by the total time and the distance between the two stations.

All commercially operated trains

See also

 Land speed record
 List of vehicle speed records
 List of high-speed trains
 High-speed rail
 , experimental car, driven by propeller, speed record for rail vehicles on 21 June 1931,   on the Berlin–Hamburg Railway

References

External links
 TGV 2007 record
 TGV 2007 record - SNCF Press release, SNCF Press release 2 
 Alstom  V 150, Alstom Press release
 Reuters TGV record, Reuters TGV record video
 Fastest steam locomotive
 RDECOM magazine 'Super Roadrunner' breaks land speed record
 846 TS HYPERSONIC UPGRADE PROGRAM (contains World Speed Record video)
 World Speed Survey 1997
  Retrouvez sur cette page les chiffres clés des records sur rail dans le monde
 Railway developments worldwide
 World Speed Survey 2007  Railway Gazette International September 2007
 Photos of the fastest trains

History of rail transport
 
Land speed records
Rail
Rail transport-related lists

1300